Jack Crisp (born 2 October 1993) is a professional Australian rules football player, currently playing for the Collingwood Football Club in the Australian Football League (AFL). He previously played for the Brisbane Lions from 2012 to 2014.

Playing career
Crisp participated in the Auskick program at Myrtleford, Victoria and played his junior football with the Murray Bushrangers.

Brisbane Lions
He was recruited with pick number forty in the 2012 Rookie Draft, following in the footsteps of fellow Murray Bushranger Tom Rockliff in playing for the Brisbane Lions. He made his debut for the Brisbane Lions in Round 4, 2012, against  in QClash 3.

Collingwood
Crisp was traded to Collingwood along with picks 5 and 25 for Dayne Beams prior to the 2014 AFL draft. Crisp made his debut for the club in their first-round clash with his previous side, Brisbane. He held his spot in the Collingwood line-up for the rest of the season, where he played all 22 games for the club. He was rewarded for his efforts that year by polling 3rd in the Copeland Trophy (a rank that earned him the J.J. Joyce Trophy) and earning the Gavin Brown Award for leading the so-called "Desire Indicators". He would continue this impressive form throughout 2019 and the COVID-19-affected season 2020, playing all games his entire stint at Collingwood.

As alluded to, Crisp has proven to be an especially consistent and durable player throughout his time at Collingwood; as of the end of the 2022 season, Crisp has played 188 consecutive AFL games, which is a Collingwood record in the AFL era (i.e., 1990 onwards), although six of those games were played with Brisbane. More significantly, the game streak stands as a record for any active player in the AFL.

Crisp won his first E.W. Copeland Trophy after being named Collingwood's 2021 club champion with 90 votes ahead of Brayden Maynard (70 votes) and Scott Pendlebury (67 votes).

Statistics
Updated to the end of the 2022 season.

|-
| 2012 ||  || 47
| 10 || 3 || 5 || 57 || 57 || 114 || 21 || 34 || 0.3 || 0.5 || 5.7 || 5.7 || 11.4 || 2.1 || 3.4 || 0
|-
| 2013 ||  || 47
| 2 || 1 || 1 || 11 || 4 || 15 || 5 || 9 || 0.5 || 0.5 || 5.5 || 2.0 || 7.5 || 2.5 || 4.5 || 0
|-
| 2014 ||  || 5
| 6 || 6 || 6 || 63 || 50 || 113 || 35 || 17 || 1.0 || 1.0 || 10.5 || 8.3 || 18.8 || 5.8 || 2.8 || 0
|-
| 2015 ||  || 25
| 22 || 16 || 10 || 282 || 202 || 484 || 85 || 106 || 0.7 || 0.5 || 12.8 || 9.2 || 22.0 || 3.9 || 4.8 || 4
|-
| 2016 ||  || 25
| 22 || 9 || 12 || 202 || 243 || 445 || 66 || 128 || 0.4 || 0.5 || 9.2 || 11.0 || 20.2 || 3.0 || 5.8 || 0
|-
| 2017 ||  || 25
| 22 || 6 || 7 || 249 || 224 || 473 || 122 || 89 || 0.3 || 0.3 || 11.3 || 10.2 || 21.5 || 5.5 || 4.0 || 0
|-
| 2018 ||  || 25
| 26 || 4 || 3 || 337 || 264 || 601 || 136 || 86 || 0.2 || 0.1 || 13.0 || 10.2 || 23.1 || 5.2 || 3.3 || 0
|-
| 2019 ||  || 25
| 24 || 2 || 5 || 345 || 269 || 614 || 148 || 83 || 0.1 || 0.2 || 14.4 || 11.2 || 25.6 || 6.2 || 3.5 || 1
|-
| 2020 ||  || 25
| 19 || 2 || 2 || 220 || 143 || 363 || 91 || 58 || 0.1 || 0.1 || 11.6 || 7.5 || 19.1 || 4.8 || 3.1 || 5
|-
| 2021 ||  || 25
| 22 || 2 || 5 || 341 || 253 || 594 || 148 || 80 || 0.1 || 0.2 || 15.5 || 11.5 || 27.0 || 6.7 || 3.6 || 11
|-
| 2022 ||  || 25
| 25 || 12 || 8 || 315 || 280 || 595 || 101 || 137 || 0.5 || 0.3 || 12.6 || 11.2 || 23.8 || 4.0 || 5.5 || 11
|- class=sortbottom
! colspan=3 | Career
! 200 !! 63 !! 64 !! 2422 !! 1989 !! 4411 !! 958 !! 827 !! 0.3 !! 0.3 !! 12.1 !! 9.9 !! 22.1 !! 4.8 !! 4.1 !! 32
|}

Notes

Honours and achievements
Individual
 2× Copeland Trophy: 2021, 2022

References

External links

1993 births
Living people
Brisbane Lions players
Australian rules footballers from Victoria (Australia)
Murray Bushrangers players
Collingwood Football Club players
Copeland Trophy winners